"Hospital Food" is a song by British singer-songwriter David Gray, released on 28 November 2005 as the second single from his seventh studio album, Life in Slow Motion (2005). The song was produced by producer Marius de Vries and received generally negative reviews upon its release. "Hospital Food" peaked at number 34 on the UK Singles Chart and remains Gray's last single to reach the UK top 40.

Track listings
UK CD1 and 7-inch single
 "Hospital Food" (radio edit)
 "Smile Like You Mean It" (BBC Radio 1 Live version; the Killers cover)

UK CD2
 "Hospital Food" (album version)
 "Baltimore" (live at V2003; Randy Newman cover)
 "Crimson Lightning"
 "Hospital Food" (live at The Church Studios, 26 July 2005) (video)

Charts

Release history

References

David Gray (musician) songs
2005 singles
2005 songs
Atlantic Records singles
Song recordings produced by Marius de Vries
Songs written by David Gray (musician)
Songs written by Rob Malone